SS Martti Ragnar was a Finnish steam freighter own by Ragnar Nordström and named after his son Martti-Ragnar Nordström.

References 

Merchant ships of Denmark
World War II merchant ships of Finland
Ships sunk by German submarines in World War II
World War II shipwrecks in the North Sea
Maritime incidents in September 1939
1903 ships
Ships built in Helsingør